Looking East is the eleventh album by American singer-songwriter Jackson Browne, released in 1996 (see 1996 in music). It peaked at number 36 on The Billboard 200.

History
Coming over two years after his successful I'm Alive, Browne returned to more politically and socially oriented themes on Looking East. Only two songs are credited to Browne alone as composer, the rest co-credited with his core backing band. The most notable song, Barricades of Heaven is a reference to the "barrios" (Spanish for low income housing) of Los Angeles.

Guests include Bonnie Raitt, David Crosby, Vonda Shepard, Ry Cooder, Waddy Wachtel and David Lindley.

Reception

Looking East was considered somewhat of a letdown after the success of I'm Alive even after reaching the Top 40 of The Billboard 200. Critic William Ruhlman agreed, writing that the album "is a highly referential work from an artist who started where most end and has been earnestly seeking the right direction ever since. Looking East finds him in his own backyard, still searching."

Track listing

Personnel 
 Jackson Browne – lead vocals, acoustic guitar (2), guitar (5, 10), acoustic piano (9)
 Benmont Tench – Hammond organ (1)
 Jeffrey Young – Hammond organ (2–10), harmony vocals (3, 5, 10), backing vocals (4), keyboards (10)
 Scott Thurston – guitar (1–3, 6, 7, 9), harmony vocals (2–4, 6), electric guitar (4), baritone guitar (5, 10), acoustic piano (8)
 Mark Goldenberg – guitar (1–3, 5–10), electric guitar (4), oud (4)
 Waddy Wachtel – guitar (1)
 Mike Campbell – 12-string guitar (2), guitar (5)
 David Lindley – lap steel guitar (3)
 Ry Cooder – slide guitar (7)
 Kevin McCormick – bass guitar, acoustic guitar (1, 2), harmony vocals (4, 10)
 Mauricio "Fritz" Lewak – drums
 Luis Conte – percussion
 Vonda Shepard – harmony vocals (1, 9)
 Beth Anderson – backing vocals (4)
 Suzie Benson – backing vocals (4)
 Mark Campbell – backing vocals (4)
 Jim Gilstrap – backing vocals (4)
 Jim Haas – backing vocals (4)
 Jon Joyce – backing vocals (4)
 Kipp Lennon – backing vocals (4)
 Phil Perry – backing vocals (4)
 Sally Stevens – backing vocals (4)
 Mark Vieha – backing vocals (4), BGV arrangements (4)
 Sir Harry Bowens – harmony vocals (5)
 William Greene Jr. – harmony vocals (5)
 Renée Geyer – harmony vocals (7)
 Bonnie Raitt – harmony vocals (7)
 Jorge Calderón – harmony vocals (8), Spanish vocals (8)
 Katia Cardenal – Spanish vocals (8)
 Salvador Cardenal – Spanish vocals (8)
 Severin Browne – harmony vocals (9)
 Valerie Carter – harmony vocals (8, 10)
 David Crosby – harmony vocals (9)

Production 
 Producers – Kevin McCormick and Scott Thurston
 Engineer – Paul Dieter 
 Assistant Engineers – Sebastian Haimerl and Bob Salcedo
 Mixing – Ed Cherney
 Mastered by Gavin Lurssen and Doug Sax at The Matering Lab (Hollywood, CA).
 Technicians – Bill Irvin and Ed Wong
 Piano Technician – Edd Kolakowski
 Art Direction and Design – Jackson Browne
 Photography – Dianna Cohen, Rob Gilley, Nels Israelson and Frank W. Ockenfels III.

Charts
Album – Billboard (United States)

References 

Jackson Browne albums
1996 albums
Elektra Records albums